Sarah Demers is an American physicist and the Horace D. Taft associate professor of physics at Yale University.

Early life and education 
Demers graduated from Phillips Andover Academy in 1994. Demers has an A.B. in Physics from Harvard University (1999). In 2001 she received an M.A. from the University of Rochester, and in 2005 she earned her Ph.D. from the University of Rochester. At Rochester, her doctoral advisor was Kevin McFarland.

She taught at Roberts Wesleyan University before accepting a postdoctoral position during which time she worked in Geneva at CERN. In 2009 she moved to Yale University where, as of 2022, she is the Horace D. Taft associate professor of physics at Yale University.

At Yale, Demers co-teaches a class at Yale on the Physics of Dance with fellow professor Emily Coates, and Demers appears in Coates' 2015 show 'Incarnations'.

Research 
Demers is a particle physicist. As an undergraduate she worked where she worked in the laboratory of Melissa Franklin on making sheets gold-coated Mylar into detectors for tracking elemental particles. Her work examines charged particles to find new methods in physics beyond the accepted Standard Model. Demers was part of the team who discovered the Higgs boson, and her work is conducted at the Large Hadron Collider. Demers also works on the ATLAS experiment and the Mu2e experiments.

Selected publications

Awards and honors 
In 2011 Demers received an early career award from the United States' Department of Energy.

References

External links

Oral history interview with Demers at the American Institute of Physics

Living people
Women physicists
Phillips Academy alumni
Harvard University alumni
University of Rochester alumni
Yale University faculty
American physicists